Goose Creek is a stream in Washington County in the U.S. state of Missouri. It is a tributary of Cedar Creek.

Goose Creek was so named on account of geese in the area.

See also
List of rivers of Missouri

References

Rivers of Washington County, Missouri
Rivers of Missouri